The 2003–04 Saint Joseph's Hawks men's basketball team represented Saint Joseph's University during the 2003–04 NCAA Division I men's basketball season. The group is one of 25 teams to finish the regular season undefeated in men's division I basketball. They were the last to do so until Wichita State did it in 2014. Under 9th year head coach Phil Martelli, the Hawks held an overall record of 27–0 and a conference record of 16–0 in the regular season before losing to Xavier in the A-10 tournament and eventually Oklahoma State in the East Regional Final of the NCAA tournament.

Roster

Jameer Nelson, (20.6 ppg/4.7 rpg)
Delonte West, (18.9 ppg/5.4 rpg)
Dwayne Jones, (6.4 ppg/7.0 rpg)
Pat Carroll,  (10.1 ppg/3.6 rpg)
Tyrone Barley,    (7.2 pgg/1.0 rpg)
Chet Stachitas
John Bryant
Dwayne Lee
Dave Mallon
Arvydas Lidzius
Artur Surov
Robert Hartshorn
Brian Jesiolowski
Rob Sullivan
Andrew Koefer

Schedule and results

Asterisk designates NCAA D-1 tournament game.

Rankings

Regular season
The Hawks dominated the regular season, going 27-0 for the season. In the Atlantic 10 tournament, the Hawks received a #1 seed, which included a first-round bye. However, they lost badly to the Xavier Musketeers 87–67. Despite their early exit, the Hawks still received a #1 seed in the NCAA Tournament. The Hawks also won the Philadelphia Big 5, going 4–0 in the process.

NCAA tournament

The Hawks received a #1 seed, and defeated Liberty, Texas Tech, and Wake Forest in the 1st, 2nd, and 3rd rounds, respectively. In the Elite 8 match-up against Oklahoma State, the Hawks lost by 2 points. John Lucas III of Oklahoma State hit a go-ahead three with only a few seconds left. On the ensuing possession, Jameer Nelson attempted to tie the game, but his 15 ft. shot fell short.

Accolades

Notes
 The Hawks progressed to the Elite Eight in the NCAA Tournament for the first time since 1981.
 Sports Illustrated named shouting Saint Joseph's staple chant, "The Hawk Will Never Die," as the number 12 thing "you gotta do before you graduate."
 The Hawks earned a spot in the Philadelphia Sports Hall of Fame after receiving the Pride of Philadelphia award in 2004.

Draft list
 Jameer Nelson was the 20th draft pick in the NBA draft of 2004 by the Denver Nuggets.
 Delonte West was the 24th draft pick in the NBA draft of 2004 by the Boston Celtics.
 Pat Carroll was a second round draft pick in the NBA Development League draft of 2009 by the Iowa Energy.
 Dwayne Jones was signed as a free agent in 2005 by the Minnesota Timberwolves.

References

Saint Joseph's
Saint Joseph's
Saint Joseph's Hawks men's basketball seasons